Donaldas Kajokas (born 13 June 1953 in Prienai, Lithuania) is a poet, essay writer and editor of the Nemunas literary supplement.   He studied at the Kaunas Institute of Physical Education and Lithuanian Physical Culture Institute. He sits on the Lithuanian Writers’ Union on the Council of Kaunas Section.

He has received numerous awards including:

 1992 Yotvingian Prize
 1992 Salomėja Nėris Award
 1998 Lithuanian Writers’ Union Award
 1999 National Culture and Art Prize
 2011 Kaunas City Municipality's Art and Culture Award
 2012 Baltic Assembly Literary Award
 2012 Kaunas Artist Association Award
 2012 The most memorable artist of Kaunas
 2013 Insignia of Honor of Kaunas City Municipality
 2013 Baltic Assembly Literary Award.

Kajokas’ work has been translated into the following languages: English, Finnish, French, Georgian, German, Hungarian, Latvian, Polish, Russian, Slovene, Spanish and Ukrainian. He has been a member of Lithuanian Writers’ Union since 1985.

References 

Lithuanian male poets
Living people
1953 births